John P. "J.P." Finnegan (August 18, 1926 – July 29, 2012) was an American film and television actor, mostly known for his recurrent role on the American crime fiction series Columbo. He voiced the villainous character Warren T. Rat in the Don Bluth’s 1986 film An American Tail.

A friend of director/actor John Cassavetes, Finnegan appeared in five of his films, including A Woman Under the Influence (1974), Gloria (1980) and Big Trouble (1986), which also starred Columbo star Peter Falk. He also appeared in Heroes (1977), The Natural (1984), School Spirit (1985), Big Man on Campus (1989) and Come See the Paradise (1990), and portrayed Judge Edward A. Haggerty in Oliver Stone's JFK (1991).

Background
One of 11 children born to Irish immigrant parents, Finnegan served in the United States Navy during World War II. He became friends with Cassavetes and Falk at the Actors Studio in his native New York City. They helped Finnegan in the early 1950s, when he moved to Los Angeles.

Finnegan died on July 29, 2012, at his home in Palm Desert, California from complications of pneumonia, aged 85.

Partial filmography

Play It as It Lays (1972) - Frank
A Woman Under the Influence (1974) - Clancy
Capone (1975) - N.Y. Police Lt.
The Killing of a Chinese Bookie (1976) - Taxi Driver
Nickelodeon (1976) - Kathleen's Director
Heroes (1977) - Mr. Munro
Opening Night (1977) - Bobby
Bloodbrothers (1978) - Bartender 
The In-Laws (1979) - Deliveryman #1
Little Miss Marker (1980) - Casino Clerk
Gloria (1980) - Frank
Love Streams (1984) - Taxi Driver
The Natural (1984) - Sam Simpson
The Journey of Natty Gann (1985) - Logging Boss
School Spirit (1985) - Pinky Batson
Big Trouble (1986) - Det. Murphy
An American Tail (1986) - Warren T. Rat (voice)
Spellbinder (1988) - George (uncredited)
Big Man on Campus (1989) - Judge Ferguson
The Last of the Finest (1990) - Tommy Grogan
Come See the Paradise (1990) - Brennan
JFK (1991) - Judge Haggerty
Last Action Hero (1993) - Watch Commander
Mars Attacks! (1996) - Speaker of the House
Vegas Vacation (1997) - Arty, the Hoover Dam Guide
The Independent (2000) - Guard

References

External links

1926 births
2012 deaths
United States Navy personnel of World War II
American male film actors
American male television actors
Deaths from pneumonia in California
Male actors from New York City
American people of Irish descent
United States Navy sailors